Akvilev (masculine) or Akvileva (feminine) is a Russian last name. It was artificially created by clergy as a Latin translation of the last name Orlov.

References

Notes

Sources
И. М. Ганжина (I. M. Ganzhina). "Словарь современных русских фамилий" (Dictionary of Modern Russian Last Names). Москва, 2001. 



Russian-language surnames